Edward Two-Two (c.1851 in the USA; died July 27, 1914, Essen, Germany) was a Lakota Sioux Native American who appeared at the beginning of the 20th century at Hagenbeck in Hamburg, Germany, and in the Sarrasani circus in Dresden educating and entertaining German audiences of Native American life.

Early life
Edward Two-Two was a Native American from the Lakota Sioux tribe, who was born on the Great Prairie of the United States, which later became the Pine Ridge Reservation in South Dakota.  He later served as a Reserve Police Officer on that reservation in 1891. He traveled to Germany in 1910 to be part of a human zoo, in the Hagenbeck Zoo of Hamburg, Germany and shortly afterward he returned to America. Sometime between 1913 and 1914, he returned with his family again to Europe, and worked at the Sarrasani circus in Dresden where he was appointed "Sioux Chief".

Due to the good treatment and recognition of his family, he expressed his wish to be buried in Dresden.  While touring in Essen he died, his body was transferred as back to Dresden and was buried at the New Catholic Cemetery. His name "Two-Two" meant in the Lakota language means "One of two". The inscription on the grave stone reads in the Lakota language: "To Paradise angel like you escort".

Other individuals
Two-Two and German writer Karl May, who wrote extensively about Native American culture and contributed to the popular image of Native Americans in German-speaking countries, never met as Karl May died in 1912, before Two-Two and his men arrived in Dresden in March 1913. In addition to the grave at the New Catholic Cemetery in Dresden, there is a second Indian grave in Emden, where another Sarrasani Indian died there in 1932. In 2012 Bettina Renner produced a documentary Bury My Heart in Dresden, which deals with the contemporary life of the Indians on the Pine Ridge Reservation in South Dakota, with Edward Two-Two and his descendants.

External sources
 Anne Drees Bach: Domesticated Wild. The exhibition "exotic" people in Germany, Campus Verlag, 2005.
 René Grießbach: Indians in Dresden, in:. Blätt'l Dresden, 18. Jg, issue 13/2007 of November 2, 2007

External links
 Bury my Heart in Dresden - The Journey of the Lakota Sioux Edward Two Two
 A Sioux in Saxony

1914 deaths